Stanley Smith (September 29, 1949 – December 9, 2020) was an American stock car racing driver and dirt-track racer, who competed in 28 NASCAR Winston Cup Series races between 1990 and 1993.

Racing career
Smith started his racing career in 1972. In 1989 he won the 1989 NASCAR All-American Challenge Series championship. Smith qualified twelfth for his first Winston Cup Series start at the 1990 DieHard 500 at Talladega Superspeedway; during the race he was involved in a pit road mishap when he lost control of his car and hit several crew members for Tracy Leslie's team. No one was seriously injured.

In 1991, Chad Knaus entered NASCAR competition as a crew member for Smith's team; Smith also introduced Interstate Batteries into NASCAR as a sponsor before the company moved to Joe Gibbs Racing. In addition to making limited Winston Cup Series starts, Smith also drove in the Busch Grand National Series, making four starts between 1991 and 1992; he also scored a victory at Michigan International Speedway in his lone start in the ARCA Permatex SuperCar Series in 1991.

At the 1993 DieHard 500 at Talladega, Smith was involved in a multi-car accident that saw fellow competitor Jimmy Horton flip over the track's retaining wall and roll down the embankment outside the track. The multi-car crash happened on lap 70 when Smith clipped Horton's car; Horton then hit three other cars before launching over the wall. Smith hit the wall almost head-on, suffering a basilar skull fracture and massive blood loss; his driver's suit was soaked in blood as he was rushed to Caraway Methodist Medical Center in critical condition. Smith was unconscious for ten days following the accident; during his recovery he underwent multiple surgeries, and the left side of his face was left paralyzed from nerve damage.

As a result of this and other wrecks, Talladega installed catch fencing along the entire track, not just where spectator stands were present; in addition, following the 1993 season NASCAR mandated cars be fitted with roof flaps in an attempt to stop flips during accidents.

While he would never race in the Winston Cup Series again, Smith would return to competition in regional racing in 1995. In 2000 he won Five Flags Speedway's Snowflake 100; in 2004, at the age of 54, he won a NASCAR AutoZone Elite Division, Southeast Series event at Kentucky Speedway. Smith's final racing start came at the 2008 Snowball Derby; he would crash after 120 laps, finishing 33rd.

Personal life
Smith was born on September 29, 1949, in Birmingham, Alabama. Outside of racing he worked in the drywall industry operating Stanley Smith Drywall Inc. (still in operation as of August, 2022) which helped to fund his racing career. He was married and had three children.

Smith died of interstitial pneumonia on December 9, 2020, at age 71. Smith had been battling the disease since September.

Motorsports career results

NASCAR
(key) (Bold – Pole position awarded by qualifying time. Italics – Pole position earned by points standings or practice time. * – Most laps led.)

Winston Cup Series

Daytona 500

Busch Series

ARCA Permatex SuperCar Series
(key) (Bold – Pole position awarded by qualifying time. Italics – Pole position earned by points standings or practice time. * – Most laps led.)

References

External links
 
 

1949 births
2020 deaths
NASCAR drivers
People from Chelsea, Alabama
Racing drivers from Alabama
ARCA Menards Series drivers
Deaths from pneumonia in Alabama